Bonn International School (BIS) is a private international school based in Bonn, Germany. It is a non-profit organization, and is managed by a board of trustees. Members of the board include BIS faculty, as well as parents of students studying at BIS. BIS currently has 800 students, ages ranging from 3 to 18 years and coming from 80 different countries. Countries include Germany, the United States of America, the United Kingdom, France, Spain, Italy, the Netherlands, China, India, Canada, Japan, South Korea and Australia.

History 
Bonn International School was founded in 1997 as a result of the merger of the former Bonn American High School, American Elementary School and British High School. The roots of these three schools in Bonn go back 65 years, making BIS one of the oldest schools in the city.

Curriculum 
BIS is a IB world school and offers the programmes of the International Baccalaureate (IB) for all ages, including International Baccalaureate Primary Years Programme (PYP), International Baccalaureate Middle Years Programme (MYP) and the IB Diploma Programme (DP). In addition to optional external IB examinations, each student is required to study for the BIS High School Diploma. BIS make the option to sit PSAT and SAT examinations available for students at regular intervals. Pastoral counseling, university advisory services and special learning needs support is available.

Accreditation 
BIS is fully accredited by the International Baccalaureate Organization, Council of International Schools (CIS) and New England Association of Schools and Colleges (NEASC).

Facilities 
The campus consists of four buildings: the "Waves" (built in 2005), the "Agora" (built in 2012) the "Crest" (built in 2016/17) and the "American club". The American Club was at one point a meeting place for US President John F. Kennedy and Federal Chancellor Konrad Adenauer.

The campus includes a media center, a design and technology center with laboratory and workshop, five science laboratories, art and music rooms, two sports halls, and fenced playgrounds. All classrooms either have smart boards or an interactive Apple TV device available. BIS does not provide transportation services.

References

British international schools in Germany
International schools in North Rhine–Westphalia
Schools in Bonn